

Events

March events 
 9 March – The Wilmington and Raleigh Railroad is completed from Wilmington to Weldon, North Carolina. At 161.5 miles (260 km), it is the world's longest railroad at this time.

April events 
 April – The Raleigh and Gaston Railroad is completed from Raleigh to near Weldon, North Carolina.

May events 
 11 May – The London and South Western Railway opens its original main line throughout to Southampton (England).

July events
 1 July - The Midland Counties Railway of England opens its line from Derby and Nottingham via Leicester to a junction with the London and Birmingham Railway at Rugby.

August events
 12 August – The Glasgow, Paisley, Kilmarnock and Ayr Railway opened between Glasgow Bridge Street railway station and Ayr, the first inter-urban railroad in Scotland.
 17 August – The first railroad built in Milan, Italy, the Milan and Monza Rail Road opens for service.

October events
 8 October – Formal opening of first section of the Taff Vale Railway, the first steam-worked passenger railway in Wales, from Cardiff Docks to Navigation House (Abercynon). Public service begins the following day.

December events
 21 December – Manchester and Birmingham Railway in England completes Stockport Viaduct (but does not yet bring it into use). It is one of the largest brick structures in Europe.

Unknown date events
 By July – August Borsig completes the first steam locomotive built in Germany.
 Mordecai W. Jackson and George Mack partner to create a farm implement manufacturing company that will eventually become Jackson and Woodin Manufacturing Company, one of the constituent companies of American Car and Foundry Company.

Births

January births
 January 8 – William Dean, Chief Mechanical Engineer of Great Western Railway of England 1877–1902 (d. 1905).
 January 29 – Henry H. Rogers, American financier who helped finance and build the Virginian Railway (d. 1909).

February births 
 February 7 – Samuel W. Fordyce, president of St. Louis, Arkansas and Texas Railway 1886–1889, St. Louis Southwestern Railway 1890–1898, Kansas City Southern Railway 1900 (d. 1919).

March births
 March 31 – Benjamin Baker, British civil engineer, designer of the  Forth Railway Bridge (d. 1907).

April births
 April – William Sykes, English railway signalling engineer (d. 1917).

June births 
 June 6 – William Dudley Chipley, president of the Baltimore and Ohio Railroad 1873–1876 (d. 1897).
 June 14 – William F. Nast, president of the Atchison, Topeka and Santa Fe Railway September 1868.
 June 27 – Alpheus Beede Stickney, first president of Chicago Great Western Railway 1884–1909 (d. 1916).

August births 
 August 23 – Brayton Ives, president of Northern Pacific Railway 1893–1896 (d. 1914).
 August 25 – George C. Magoun, Chairman of the Board of Directors for Atchison, Topeka and Santa Fe Railway in the late 1880s (d. 1893).

November births
 November 17 – Edmund Morel, English-born civil engineer in Japan (d. 1871).
 November 24 – Henry Kirke Porter, American steam locomotive builder and founder of H. K. Porter, Inc (d. 1921).

Deaths

April deaths
 April 12 – Franz Anton von Gerstner, Bohemian-born railway civil engineer (b. 1796)

References